Ambassador K. P. Fabian (born 23 September 1940) is an Indian Diplomat who served in the Indian Foreign Service  between 1964 and 2000, during which time he was posted to Madagascar, Austria, Iran, Sri Lanka, Canada, Finland, Qatar and Italy.

Career

During his time in the diplomatic service, he spent three years in Iran (from 1976 to 1979), witnessing the Iranian Revolution first hand. As Joint Secretary (Gulf), Fabian coordinated the evacuation of over 176,000 Indian nationals from Iraq and Kuwait in 1990–91. His multilateral experience includes representing India at the United Nations Industrial Development Organization, International Atomic Energy Agency, International Civil Aviation Organization, Food and Agriculture Organization, World Food Programme and the International Fund for Agricultural Development. He is also the author of two books, Commonsense on the War on Iraq, which was published in 2003 and Diplomacy: Indian Style. Even while in service, Ambassador Fabian wrote and spoke on international affairs, mainly at universities in Madagascar, Austria, Iran, Sri Lanka, Canada, Finland, Qatar and Italy. The first address he delivered was on Mahatma Gandhi in 1969 at The Charles de Gaulle University, Tananarive, Madagascar. His presentation on the North-South Dialogue was published as a monograph by McGill University, Montreal(1983). In the corporate sector, for three years starting from 2002, he was on the board of Rashtriya Chemicals and Fertilizers in Mumbai and concurrently chaired the Audit Committee of the Board. He was on the board of the Syndicate Bank from 2003-2006. He was a visiting professor at Jawaharlal Nehru University, New Delhi from 2003-04. He held the position of KPS Menon Chair at Mahatma Gandhi University, Kottayam from 2012-13. He was also the Chairman of Banyan Tree Holdings, Chennai. Currently he is a board member of The Hope Project, New Delhi and Professor, at the Indian Society of International Law, New Delhi. He is also the Chief Advisor of Minerva Model United Nations founded by Arsh Arora and Yash Maheshwari.

Evacuation of Indians from Kuwait

During the Invasion of Kuwait by Saddam Hussein's Iraq Fabian worked closely with Gujral then Joint Secretary (Gulf Division, Ministry of External Affairs), KP Fabian coordinated the evacuation initiative. This involved working with officers across ministries working in the Gulf, and respond to the needs of the stranded people in Kuwait. He also was personally responsible in keeping the Air India ready for the emergency operation. The 1990 airlift of Indians from Kuwait was carried out from August 13, 1990 to October 20, 1990 after the Invasion of Kuwait. Air India helped evacuate 175,000 people by civil airliners. The operation was carried out before the Persian Gulf War in 1990 to evacuate Indian expatriates from Kuwait.Those stranded were evacuated from Amman, Jordan, to Mumbai by Air India, operating 488 flights in coordination with Indian Airlines.

Books Authored

 The Commonsense on the War on Iraq K. P. Fabian (2003) 
 Diplomacy: Indian Style K. P. Fabian (2012)
 The Arab Spring That Was and Wasn’t (2022)

See also
 Syed Akbaruddin

References

1940 births
Living people
Indian diplomats
Indian Foreign Service officers
World Food Programme people
Indian officials of the United Nations